Gymnastics is a popular sport in Azerbaijan.

History
Gymnastics was introduced to Azerbaijan in the Soviet period when Azerbaijani gymnast Lina Vinnikova participated in the 1961 world tournament in Germany.

Aside from artistic gymnastics, rhythmic gymnastics started to develop in Azerbaijan after the 1984 Summer Olympics. Rhythmic gymnastics was particularly boosted after Mehriban Aliyeva become President of the Azerbaijan Gymnastics Federation in 2002.

Azerbaijan has produced many notable and talented gymnasts including Valery Belenky, Aliya Garayeva, Anna Gurbanova, Dinara Gimatova and hosted big competitions like the 2005 World Rhythmic Gymnastics Championships, 2007 Rhythmic Gymnastics European Championships, 2009 Rhythmic Gymnastics European Championships and 2014 Rhythmic Gymnastics European Championships. As of November 2013, Yulia Inshina and Anna Pavlova will be representing Azerbaijan.

In 2015, the National Gymnastics Arena was built in Azerbaijan.

Events 
The first sporting championship in 5 disciplines of gymnastics (Men's and Women's Artistic Gymnastics, Trampoline Gymnastics, Acrobatic Gymnastics and Aerobic Gymnastics) – the Joint Gymnastics Championships in Azerbaijan – was organized in August 2014. In December 2014, an Inter-regional Cup was conducted in the framework of Azerbaijan and Baku Rhythmic Gymnastics Championship. In March 2015, the Open Joint Azerbaijan Championship in Gymnastics was organized as a test event before Baku 2015.

Azerbaijan hosted several international championships in gymnastics:

Medal winners

See also 
Azerbaijan Gymnastics Federation

References

External links
Official website of Azerbaijani Gymnastics Federation  

 
Sport in Azerbaijan